Abraham Jacobus Coetzee (born ) is a South African rugby union player for English Premiership side Bath Rugby. His regular position is number eight.

Rugby career

2013–2014: Youth rugby

Coetzee was born in Pretoria, but grew up in KwaZulu-Natal. He attended Glenwood High School, where he earned selections to represent KwaZulu-Natal at the premier high school rugby union tournament in South Africa, the Under-18 Craven Week in both 2013 and 2014. He scored one try in the 2013 event, in a 77–14 victory over Border, and scored three tries in 2014 – two in a 38–27 win over the Pumas and one in a 15–36 defeat to the Blue Bulls – in a tournament where he also captained the team. After the tournament, he was named in a South Africa Schools squad, also named captain of the team. He captained them to a victory over France in their first match, but sustained an ankle injury and missed the remaining two matches in the Under-18 International Series.

2015–2016: Western Province Under-19 and Under-21

After high school, Coetzee moved to Cape Town to join 's academy. He scored four tries in eleven starts for the  team in the 2015 Under-19 Provincial Championship, and three tries in six starts for the  team in the 2016 Under-21 Provincial Championship.

2017: Stormers

2021: Bath Rugby 
In February 2021 it was confirmed that Coetzee would join English Premiership Rugby side Bath ahead of the 2021–22 season.

References

South African rugby union players
Living people
1996 births
Rugby union players from Pretoria
Rugby union flankers
Rugby union number eights
Stormers players
Western Province (rugby union) players
Bath Rugby players
Rugby sevens players at the 2014 African Youth Games